Starwolf is a series of three novels by Edmond Hamilton featuring heavy-worlder Morgan Chane. Chane was the son of a human missionary family to a heavier-than-Earth-normal world of Viking-like aliens. During the years of his life, his parents died and left him an orphan to be incorporated into the Starwolf society. As an adult he felt himself to be as much a Starwolf as his alien companions. After a dispute over plunder with a fellow Starwolf (leaving the other Starwolf dead), Chane flees (under threat of death) from Starwolf society. As a fugitive and hiding his ex-Starwolf status (the rest of the galaxy "declares a holiday when a Starwolf is killed"), Chane becomes part of a "Merc" human mercenary group commanded by a Merc named John Dilullo.

The three books are:

 The Weapon from Beyond (1967)
 The Closed Worlds (1968)
 World of the Starwolves (1968)

The series was later adapted into a television series of the same name in Japan, which were in turn edited into two English-language films.

References

1960s novels
American science fiction novels
American novel series